Charles Lim, better known as Charlie Lim, is a Singaporean singer-songwriter, musician, producer and artist.

Personal life
Lim was exposed to music from a young age, especially since his mother taught the piano. He started singing and playing the piano in church and in school bands, learning how to play by ear. He was educated at Victoria School where he was with the school choir which came in second at the Singapore Youth Festival. At 14, he moved to Melbourne, Australia and wanted to pursue medicine or journalism, but "music got the better of him". In 2005, he topped the state of Victoria for music performance and was selected by VCE's Season of Excellence to perform at Melbourne's Hamer Hall. He later returned to Singapore to serve National Service, during which he joined the Singapore Armed Forces Music & Drama Company as their frontman for the combo band, which involved performing for foreign dignitaries, army recruits, students, black tie events, as well as goodwill tours in Australia and Brunei. Lim continued his studies at Monash University in 2008 to complete his bachelor's degree in Music Performance, before returning to Singapore in 2012 where he is currently based.

Musical career
Charlie broke into the Southeast Asian music scene in 2011 with his self-titled debut EP. Signing with management label House of Riot! in 2012, he continued to tour the region, playing major festivals such as Mosaic Music Festival in Singapore, Singapore International Jazz Festival, Wonderland Festival in Manila, Jarasum International Jazz Festival in Korea, Urbanscapes in Kuala Lumpur, Clockenflap in Hong Kong, Java Jazz Festival in Indonesia, Bigsound and Brisbane Festival in Australia, supporting acts such as Kimbra, BADBADNOTGOOD, Émilie Simon, Hiatus Kaiyote, Lucy Rose, Sigur Ros, Lenka, Ta-Ku and Snarky Puppy.

Lim released TIME/SPACE in 2015, an introspective and melancholic double EP that explores "different polarities" of his musical interests, with TIME reflecting his singer-songwriter sensibilities and SPACE a manifestation of his DIY approach to experimental pop/R&B production. The album went to #1 on Singapore's iTunes charts within an hour of its release. Singapore's leading newspaper The Straits Times gave it a glowing review of 4.5/5 stars, and was also awarded Best Pop Album of 2015. Popular media outlets such as TODAY, Bandwagon, Popspoken, Vulcan Post, Beehype, Buro 24/7, Honeycombers, Native Entertainment, and JUICE also considered the record as one of the best music releases of the year.

Following two landmark, sold-out shows at the 10th edition of the Mosaic Music Festival – an achievement never claimed by a Singaporean artist – Charlie premiered TIME/SPACE to another sold-out crowd at Singapore's premier concert venue, the 1600-seater Esplanade Concert Hall, as part of a triple bill with Inch Chua and The Great Spy Experiment.

In 2015, Lim was commissioned to write two theme songs for the 28th Southeast Asian Games and was asked to perform his song "Still" at the Singapore National Stadium for the Games' closing ceremony.

In late 2016, Lim signed his first major record deal with Universal Music Singapore and released his sophomore album CHECK-HOOK in 2018, which also clinched a #1 spot on the iTunes chart and was awarded Best Song of The Year by Apple Music. 

For the 2018 Singapore National Day Parade, Lim updated the classic 1987 National Day song, We Are Singapore, which it was performed during the parade. His prelude was then turned into a full song, Room at the Table –which was the opening song for 2020's National Day Parade, with proceeds from the song donated to charities supporting migrant workers during the pandemic. 

In 2021, Charlie won the Young Artist Award conferred by the National Arts Council, Singapore's highest award for young arts practitioners aged 35 and below. He is currently music director of Indiego, a local internet radio station and platform for local and independent music.

Discography
 Charlie Lim EP (2011)
 TIME/SPACE (2015)
 CHECK-HOOK (2018)
 Hollow (2018) with Katz
 CHECK-HOOK: Remixes - Wave 1 (2019)
 CHECK-HOOK: Remixes - Wave 2 (2020)
 Welcome Home [Swimful Remix] (2020) with BIBI
 Hummingbird (2020) with Linying
 Two Sides (2020) with Gentle Bones
 Room at the Table (2020)
 Live at the Star Theatre (2020)
 Ashes (2020) with Miho Fukuhara
 Won't You Come Around (2021) with Aisyah Aziz
 Forgetting (2021) with Katz
 So I Say What's Up (2022) with Sheikh Haikel
 Boyhood (2022) with ABANGSAPAU
 Into Dreams (2022) with Ng Pei-Sian

Music videos

References

External links
 
 Charlie Lim on Spotify

Year of birth missing (living people)
Living people
21st-century Singaporean male singers
Singaporean singer-songwriters
Victoria School, Singapore alumni
Singaporean people of Chinese descent